Red Stick Roller Derby (RSRD) is a women's flat track roller derby league based in Baton Rouge, Louisiana. Founded in 2007, the league currently consists of two teams which compete against teams from other leagues. Red Stick is a member of the Women's Flat Track Derby Association (WFTDA).

History
The league was founded in July 2007, the second roller derby league in Louisiana after the Big Easy Rollergirls, and played its first bout in October 2008.  Soon, the league was competing with teams from across the south.

Red Stick was accepted into the Women's Flat Track Derby Association Apprentice Program in July 2010, and became a full WFTDA member in December 2011.

RSRD run a junior roller derby program, Red Stick Roller Derby Juniors. Their Red Stick Rascals compete in JRDA competitions.

WFTDA rankings

References

Roller derby leagues established in 2007
Roller derby leagues in Louisiana
Women's Flat Track Derby Association Division 3
Sports competitions in Baton Rouge, Louisiana
Women's sports in the United States
2007 establishments in Louisiana